McGeough is a surname. Notable people with the surname include:

Gerry McGeough (born 1958), Irish republican
Jim McGeough (born 1963), Canadian ice hockey
Jimmy McGeough (born 1944), Northern Irish footballer and manager
Jimmy McGeough, Jr., American soccer player
Joseph McGeough (born 1940), Scottish engineer and academic
Joseph McGeough (nuncio) (1903–1970), American archbishop, Vatican diplomat
Mick McGeough (born 1957), Canadian ice hockey referee
Paul McGeough, Australian journalist